Wissem Samia Dali (born September 1, 1995 in Béjaïa) is an Algerian volleyball player.

Club information
Current club :  MB Bejaia

References

1995 births
Volleyball players from Béjaïa
Living people
Algerian women's volleyball players
Liberos
21st-century Algerian people